Uttur is town located in the southern part of Kolhapur District of Maharashtra. It is part of Ajara Tehsil. Uttur is also known for Saturday Weekly market place in Panchkroshi.

PIN Code 416220.

Offices
 Grampanchayat 
 Talathi office
 Post office
 BSNL Office

See also
 Kadgaon
 Nesari
 Mahagaon,Gadhinglaj
 Harali
 Mugruwadi
 Halkarni
 Gadhinglaj Taluka
 State Highway 134 (Maharashtra)

References

Cities and towns in Kolhapur district
Talukas in Maharashtra